The 1992 East Texas State Lions football team represented East Texas State University—now known as Texas A&M University–Commerce—as a member of the Lone Star Conference (LSC) during the 1992 NCAA Division II football season. Led by seventh-year head coach Eddie Vowell, the Lions compiled an overall record of 8–3 with a mark of 5–1 in conference play, placing second in the LSC. East Texas State finished the season at No. 14 in the  NCAA Division II rankings. The team played its home games at Memorial Stadium in Commerce, Texas. Senior defensive back Eric Turner was a nominee for the Harlon Hill Trophy.

Schedule

Postseason awards

Harlon Hill Trophy nominee
Eric Turner, Defensive Back, Senior

All-Americans
Eric Turner, Defensive Back, First Team
Fred Woods, Linebacker, First Team
Billy Watkins, Placekicker, First Team
Pat Williams, Defensive Back, First Team 
Curtis Buckley, Strong Safety, Second Team
Anthony Brooks, Wide Receiver, Third Team
Earl Bell, Offensive Tackle, Honorable Mention
Duane Hicks, Defensive Tackle, Honorable Mention

All-Lone Star Conference

LSC superlatives
Offensive Player of the Year: Anthony Brooks
Defensive Player of the Year: Eric Turner

LSC First Team
Earl Bell, Offensive Tackle
Anthony Brooks, Wide Receiver 
Curtis Buckley, Strong Safety
Duane Hicks, Defensive Tackle
Michael Hightower, Running Back
Billy Minor, Wide Receiver 
Eric Turner, Cornerback
Billy Watkins, Kicker
Pat Williams, Defensive Back
Fred Woods, Linebacker

LSC Second Team
Clint Dolezel, Quarterback
Cubby Gillingwater, Punter 
Eric Herrick, Offensive Guard
Jarobi Nelson, Defensive Line
Terrance Toliver, Linebacker

LSC Honorable Mention
Jeremy Griffin, Running Back
Mark Jones, Safety
Steve Malin, Offensive Tackle

References

East Texas State
Texas A&M–Commerce Lions football seasons
East Texas State Lions football